The Lyre of Delight is a 1978 Brazilian drama film directed by Walter Lima Jr. The film was selected as the Brazilian entry for the Best Foreign Language Film at the 51st Academy Awards, but was not accepted as a nominee.

Cast
 Anecy Rocha as Ness Elliott
 Cláudio Marzo
 Paulo César Peréio
 Antonio Pedro

See also
 List of submissions to the 51st Academy Awards for Best Foreign Language Film
 List of Brazilian submissions for the Academy Award for Best Foreign Language Film

References

External links
 

1978 films
1978 drama films
1970s Portuguese-language films
Brazilian drama films
Films directed by Walter Lima Jr.